Žabče is a village northeast of Tolmin in the Littoral region of Slovenia.

The local church, built to the east of the settlement, is dedicated to Saint Mark and belongs to the Parish of Tolmin.

References

External links
Žabče on Geopedia

Populated places in the Municipality of Tolmin